The Native Plant Society of Texas is a Texas not-for-profit conservation organization that promotes the "conservation, research and utilization of the native plants and plant habitats of Texas through education, outreach and example".

The organization includes both statewide programs and local chapters. There are over 4,000 members and volunteers in 34 local chapters throughout the state which participate in community work projects, plant surveys, workshops, landscaping projects, and demonstration gardens. Members range from amateur plant enthusiasts and gardeners, to professional botanists and horticulturists, alongside naturalists, hikers, and nature photographers.

The organization is funded by a combination of gifts, grants and membership dues. The headquarters is located at 320 West San Antonio St, in Fredericksburg, Texas. The Native Plant Society of Texas was founded in 1981 by Carroll Abbott, of Kerrville, Texas, and sponsored by several members of the faculty of Texas Woman's University, along with other interested individuals.

The Native Plant Society of Texas publishes a quarterly magazine including news about organization activities as well as stories and photographs on native plants and native plant habitats in Texas and related items.

Goals
The Native Plant Society of Texas aims to educate both its members and the general public and to foster a greater awareness of the Texas native flora; to encourage landscaping with appropriate native plants; to protect, conserve and restore native plants threatened by development; to encourage the responsible propagation of native plants; and to promote appreciation and understanding of current, historical and potential uses of native plants.

Programs
The Native Plant Partners program is a collaborative effort between the Society and local growers and retail nurseries to make native plants more available to consumers. Local chapters choose the native plants for their area and publicize them at nurseries with special displays and other publicity.

The Native Landscape Certification Program is a series of day-long classes that teach the practice of using native plants in home and commercial landscapes. Classes are available in the spring and fall to members and non-members in many areas of the state.

The Bring Back the Monarch to Texas Program encourages the preservation of native milkweed and nectar plants along the central flyway of this migrating species. Grants are awarded to schools and communities to create waystations for the monarch butterflies. A seed-gathering program is helping to increase the availability of milkweed. The organization has also built and maintains Monarch Waystations at some rest areas along Interstate 35 in Texas, in cooperation with the Texas Department of Transportation.

The organization awards grants each year to promote native plant research by graduate and undergraduate students at Texas universities.

There is an annual awards banquet which recognizes publications, research and other activities in the field of native plants.

Chapter activities
Chapters of the Native Plant Society of Texas organize many events of local significance. In keeping with the public outreach and education mission of the society, these events are usually free and open to the public.

 Native plant sales in spring and fall
 General meetings with monthly or bimonthly frequency
 Lectures, talks, and workshops
 Field trips

Annual symposiums
Every fall an annual multi-day educational symposium is held in a different vegetational region of Texas celebrating the unique flora of the region. The symposium features an awards banquet, exhibitions, lectures and field trips within the region. The Society also holds a one-day symposium in the spring at Lady Bird Johnson Wildflower Center in Austin.

References

Native plant societies based in the United States
Environmental organizations based in Texas
Organizations established in 1981
Flora of Texas